De Camp Nunatak is a lone nunatak standing  southeast of Welcome Mountain in the Outback Nunataks, Victoria Land, Antarctica. The geographical feature was first mapped by the United States Geological Survey from surveys and U.S. Navy air photos, 1959–64, and was named by the Advisory Committee on Antarctic Names for Michael A. de Camp, a biologist at McMurdo Station, Hut Point Peninsula, Antarctica, 1966–67. The nunatak lies situated on the Pennell Coast, a portion of Antarctica lying between Cape Williams and Cape Adare.

References 

 

Nunataks of Victoria Land
Pennell Coast